Bembrops anatirostris, commonly known as a duckbill flathead, is a species of fish in the family Percophidae.

References

M. Okiyama, Two types of pelagic larvae of Bembrops (Trachinoidea: Percophidae), with notes on their phylogenetic implication, Bulletin of marine science, 1997, vol. 60.

Percophidae
Fish described in 1955